is a town located in Nagano Prefecture, Japan. , the town had an estimated population of 4,451 in 2091 households, and a population density of 26 persons per km².

Geography
Agematsu is located in a mountainous area of south-western Nagano Prefecture, bordered by the Kiso Mountains to the north. The Kiso River flows through the town.

Surrounding municipalities
Nagano Prefecture
 Komagane
 Miyada
 Kiso
 Ōkuwa
 Ōtaki

Demographics 
Per Japanese census data, the population of Agematsu has been declining steady over the past 60 years.

Climate
The town has a climate characterized by characterized by hot and humid summers, and cold winters (Köppen climate classification Cfa).  The average annual temperature in Agematsu is 10.1 °C. The average annual rainfall is 1676 mm with September as the wettest month. The temperatures are highest on average in August, at around 22.8 °C, and lowest in January, at around -2.2 °C.

History
The area of present-day Agematsu was part of ancient Shinano Province. Agematsu-juku developed as a post station on the Nakasendō highway connected Edo with Kyoto in the Edo period. The modern village of Komagane was established on April 1, 1889 by the establishment of the municipalities system. The village was divided into the towns of Komagane and Agematsu on September 3, 1922.

Education
The town has one public elementary school and one public middle school operated by the town government. The town does not have a high school. The Institute for Space–Earth Environmental Research of Nagoya University is located in Agematsu.

Transportation

Railway
 JR Tōkai - Chūō Main Line
 -

Highway

Local attractions
Nezame no toko (Nezame Gorge), a Nationally designated Place of Scenic Beauty

Notable people
Mitakeumi Hisashi, professional sumo wrestler

References

External links

Official Website 

 
Towns in Nagano Prefecture